Melese sordida is a moth of the family Erebidae first described by Walter Rothschild in 1909. It is usually found in Costa Rica to  Peru.

References

Moths described in 1909
Melese